Betty Wright Harris is an American chemist. She is known for her work on the chemistry of explosives completed at Los Alamos National Laboratory. She patented a spot test for detecting 1,3,5-triamino-2,4,6-trinitrobenzene (TATB) in the field,  which is used by the Federal Department of Homeland Security to screen for nitroaromatic explosives.

Early life and education
Harris was born on 29 July 1940 in Ouachita Parish, Monroe, Louisiana. She and her 11 siblings were raised on a farm by Henry Hudson "Jake" and Legertha Evelyn Thompson Wright. She attended Union Central High School, enrolling at Southern University at the age of 16. She received her B.S. in Chemistry with a minor in Mathematics at the age of 19 and subsequently attended Atlanta University, receiving her M.S. degree. She taught as an assistant professor of chemistry and mathematics at Mississippi Valley State University, Southern University and Colorado College.

Harris was awarded a PhD in Chemistry from the University of New Mexico in 1975, with a dissertation titled "Reactions of 2-aminopyridine with picryl halides".

Career

After gaining her PhD, she taught chemistry and mathematics at Mississippi Valley State University and Southern University. Harris subsequently moved to do research at Los Alamos National Laboratory, where she worked in the areas of hazardous waste treatment and environmental remediation as well as explosives chemistry. Areas of focus included explosives detection, safing liquids, synthesis and characterization of insensitive high explosives and sensitivity of weathered high explosives. In addition to her research, she has worked in outreach to young people, including working with the Girl Scouts in developing a badge based on chemistry.

During a leave of absence from LANL, Harris was the chief of chemical technology for Solar Turbine Inc., where she managed the technical laboratories and investigated cold-end corrosion of super alloys, which was caused by sulfuric acid and soot in gas turbine engines. For the last eleven years of Harris's career, she worked at the U.S. Department of Energy Office of Classification as a certified document reviewer.

Awards

She has received the New Mexico Governor's Trailblazer Award, and is recognized as a distinguished African American Scientist by the National Academy of Sciences. She is a member of Women in Science and Engineering and the American Association for the Advancement of Science, and served as President of the New Mexico Business and Professional Women’s Organization. She is a 50-year member of the American Chemical Society.

Personal life
Harris lives in Los Alamos, NM and has three children.

Patent
 Harris, "Spot test for 1,3,5-triamino-2,4,6-trinitrobenzene, TATB"

References

External links
  ACS and NOBCChE video of "Five black chemists who changed the world"
[2] Betty W. Harris biography
[3] Featured Inventors: Dr. Betty Harris
[4] Betty Wright Harris
[5] Meet Dr Betty Wright Harris, inventor of test that detects explosives

1940 births
Living people
African-American chemists
Academics from Louisiana
Los Alamos National Laboratory personnel
Southern University alumni
Clark Atlanta University alumni
People from Monroe, Louisiana
University of New Mexico alumni
21st-century African-American people
20th-century African-American people